X-Factor is an American comic book series published by Marvel Comics. It is a spin-off from the popular X-Men franchise, featuring characters from X-Men stories. The series has been relaunched several times with different team rosters, most recently as X-Factor (2020), written by Leah Williams.

X-Factor launched in 1986, featuring the five original X-Men reorganizing as a group in response to the seeming outlaw status of the then-current X-Men team of whom Magneto was a member. In 1991, the founding members were incorporated back into the regular X-Men series, and X-Factor relaunched as a U.S. government-sponsored team incorporating many secondary characters from the X-Men mythos. The series was canceled in 1998 after 149 issues.

The 2005 X-Factor series followed the mutant detective agency X-Factor Investigations. Written by Peter David, the series drew acclaim from Ain't It Cool News, and won a 2011 GLAAD Media Award for Outstanding Comic Book for the romantic relationship between Rictor and Shatterstar. The series ended in 2013 after 114 issues. The following year a new series, All-New X-Factor, was launched featuring a new corporate-sponsored X-Factor team. It was written by Peter David and drawn by Carmine Di Giandomenico. It was cancelled after 20 issues due to low sales.

Publication history

Original team (1986–1991)
X-Factor launched in 1986 featuring a team composed of the five original X-Men that debuted in X-Men #1 (1963):

 Angel – A millionaire heir, capable of flight by means of two feathery wings extending from his back.
 Beast – A brilliant scientist possessing bestial strength and agility.
 Cyclops – Former X-Men team leader, with the ability to emit powerful "optic blasts" from his eyes (the origin of the optic blast are portals in his eyes from another dimension).
 Jean Grey (Marvel Girl) – The long-time love of Cyclops, possessing telekinetic abilities.
 Iceman – A brash jokester, gifted with cryokinetic (the ability to lower temperature around him and form ice) abilities.

Original writer Bob Layton wanted X-Factor to be a reunion of the original X-Men, an event complicated by the extensive histories of the characters following the initiation of a new team of X-Men in 1975. In the 1970s and early 1980s, Angel, Beast, and Iceman wandered through various superhero teams. By 1985, all three were members of the Defenders. With the monthly Defenders series already due to be cancelled, Marvel's editorial staff elected to have the other members of the group killed off in the final issue in order to free up Angel, Beast, and Iceman for X-Factor.

A more difficult task was the return of Cyclops and Jean Grey. In 1980, Jean Grey was killed during the seminal Dark Phoenix Saga, and since it was considered vital that the team have a female member, Layton opted to use fellow mutant Dazzler. Publicity material for the series began to appear at this time, with images of the team using a blank space or silhouette in place of the female member as a teaser mystery. However, writer Kurt Busiek had earlier thought of a way to add Jean Grey to the roster which somebody else suggested that became one of the most significant cases of retroactive continuity in comic book history: Jean Grey had never actually been the Phoenix. Instead, the Phoenix entity copied Grey's identity and form, keeping her safe in a cocoon-like structure beneath Jamaica Bay. Busiek related the idea to Roger Stern, who related it to John Byrne. Byrne wrote and illustrated Fantastic Four #286 (1985), incorporating Busiek's idea. Several panels of this comic were rewritten (by X-Men writer Chris Claremont) and redrawn (by initial X-Factor artist Jackson Guice) to depict the Phoenix entity as less malevolent than Byrne intended.

In order to join the team, Cyclops walked out on his new wife Madelyne Pryor, an Alaskan pilot who bore a strange resemblance to Grey, and their infant son, Nathan Christopher. These events, along with the resurrection of Grey in general, were highly controversial with fans.

The original X-Men disassociate with the current team because Professor X had placed their old nemesis, Magneto, as its leader. The five original members set up a business advertised as mutant-hunters for hire, headquartered in the TriBeCa neighborhood of downtown New York City, posing as "normal" (non-superpowered) humans to their clients. The mutants that X-Factor capture are secretly trained to control their powers and reintegrated into society. Through their "mutant hunting" they recruit a group of young wards:

 Artie Maddicks – A pink-skinned, mute child who could project hologram-like images of his thoughts.
 Tabitha Smith – A young woman who ran away from her abusive father, who can create handheld energy spheres that she can explode at will, which she calls "time bombs".
 Rusty Collins – A former member of the U.S. Navy whose pyrokinesis first manifested uncontrollably, severely injuring a woman.
 Leech – A green-skinned young boy, who can dampen the mutant powers of those around him.
 Rictor – A Mexican teenager who can produce powerful seismic waves.
 Skids – A runaway who could project a protective force field around her body.

Eventually, the team decides that the "mutant hunter" ruse did more harm than good by inflaming hatred, and blames it on X-Factor's original business manager, Cameron Hodge, who is revealed as a mutant-hating mastermind.

Bob Layton and Jackson Guice wrote and illustrated, respectively, the first few issues of X-Factor. They soon turned over creative duties to Louise Simonson (writer) and Walt Simonson (artist). Despite their relationship as husband and wife, both the Simonsons have said they did not approach work with each other any differently than any other collaboration; in particular, though Walt occasionally contributed ideas, he did not co-plot the series with his wife. In X-Factor #6 (1986), Louise introduced Apocalypse, who would appear in multiple issues and become X-Factor's nemesis.

Louise Simonson placed the series in line with the darker tone of most of the X-Men franchise; after a year on X-Factor, she remarked that "in real life all of my friends should be happy, but in comic books all of my characters should be miserable." In X-Factor #10, the Marauders, a group of mutant mercenaries, severely injure Angel's wings, which are later amputated. When an interviewer commented on the brutality of this turn of events, Walt Simonson replied, "Hey, that's nothing compared to what happens to him eventually." Despondent, Angel attempts suicide by detonating his airliner mid-flight, but Apocalypse rescues him and transforms him into Death, one of his Four Horsemen, giving him metal wings and blue skin. Angel escaped Apocalypse's control, but these physical changes remain. He is renamed Archangel and becomes a much darker character, eventually rejoining the team in issue #36. Angel's replacement on X-Factor, Caliban, turns to Apocalypse for more power in issue #24, with Apocalypse leaving X-Factor his ship in return.

In the 1989 crossover Inferno, Madelyne Pryor is revealed to be a clone of Jean Grey created by the mutant geneticist Mister Sinister. Manipulated by demons and tormented by Scott's rejection of her, Madelyne kills herself in a suicide attack on X-Factor.

Wanting to do stories with more focus on X-Factor's teenage wards, Louise Simonson successfully petitioned editor Bob Harras for permission to do a miniseries featuring them. Following the miniseries, titled X-Terminators, the characters left X-Factor and were moved to New Mutants.

In the last major storyline of the first X-Factor series, published in early 1991, Apocalypse kidnaps Nathan Summers, sensing that he would grow up to be a powerful mutant and possible threat. X-Factor rescue Nathan from Apocalypse's lunar base, but find him infected with a "techno-organic" virus that cannot be treated. A clan of rebels from the future, known as the Askani, send a representative to the present time to bring Nathan 2,000 years into the future to be treated. Fully grown, he returns to the 20th century as the antihero, Cable.

X-Factor, the X-Men, and several minor characters team up to fight the telepathic Shadow King in another crossover event, The Muir Island Saga. Afterward, the original members of X-Factor rejoin the X-Men and several characters from various X-Men-related series become founding members of a new X-Factor.

Government team (1991–1998)
Rather than end the series, Marvel hired writer Peter David and illustrator Larry Stroman to recreate X-Factor with new members, all of whom were already allies of the X-Men, and three of whom were involved in the Muir Island Saga. The new X-Factor worked for the Pentagon, replacing Freedom Force as the government's salaried mutant team. Their relationship with their benefactors was often strained and complicated. The new X-Factor, debuting in issue #71, included:

 Valerie Cooper – A U.S. government agent with history as both ally and adversary of the X-Men who becomes X-Factor's government liaison, carrying over from her duties as liaison to a prior government-sponsored team of mutants, Freedom Force.
 Havok – A former X-Man and brother of Cyclops who can manipulate powerful, but hard to control, cosmic rays. Havok serves as X-Factor's leader.
 Multiple Man – He can create duplicates of himself on physical impact. He was previously offered X-Men membership, but he declined, opting instead to work at the Muir Island research center.
 Polaris – Havok's long-time lover, and also a former X-Man who can control magnetism. Rumored to be Magneto's Daughter.
 Quicksilver – A long-running Avengers character, and a former foe of the X-Men, who possesses super speed and a difficult temperament. 
 Strong Guy – A wise-cracking character who can re-channel kinetic energy aimed at him, transforming it into muscular mass and power. Lila Cheney's former bodyguard.
 Wolfsbane – A Scottish, former New Mutant who can transform into a wolf-like creature. Some artificial manipulation of her feelings cause her to love Havok, bringing her much conflict and frustration because she knows he loves Polaris.

The lineup was selected by the X-Factor editorial staff. Legion was to be a member as well, but was dropped because it was felt the character was not suited to be a team player. David was instead given the option to use Quicksilver, which he has said was a pleasant surprise.

Commenting on his approach to the series, David said that his priority was to tell stories which developed the individual characters of the team, remarking "I feel there's nothing unique to the book if you come up with a generic plot and just plug in these characters."

David left in 1993. The series continued under writer J. M. DeMatteis and artist Jan Duursema, but struggled to distinguish itself among other X-books. Shortly after David's tenure on the book ended, Forge, a former government weapons contractor whose mutant powers were his brilliant engineering skills, was added to the group; first replacing Cooper as their liaison after she had been compromised by one of Magneto's Acolytes, and later as an active member. Cooper later becomes an active member as well, her marksmanship and athletic skills compensating for her lack of superhuman powers.

In a 1995 story, Multiple Man apparently dies of the Legacy Virus, a deadly illness that attacks mutant genes, which is later revealed to have only killed one of his duplicates. Strong Guy is put into suspended animation after suffering a heart attack caused by the stress his extra mass put on his body. Wolfsbane, cured of her artificial love for Alex, transfers to the European mutant team Excalibur. Havok leaves to infiltrate a mutant terrorist ring.

Writer John Francis Moore and illustrator Jeff Matsuda introduced a new X-Factor line-up, consisting of Forge as the team's new leader, Polaris, Cooper, and several new recruits:

 Mystique – A shapeshifting mutant criminal and master of espionage. Mystique is forced to join X-Factor following her capture by federal agents.
 Sabretooth – A homicidal mutant criminal who possesses talons, heightened senses, and a healing factor. Like Mystique, Sabretooth is a captive member that Forge uses special technology to control.
 Shard – A holographic computer program with the personality of the X-Man Bishop's deceased sister of the same name. Bishop is a time-traveler from a distant future, where he and Shard are members of Xavier's Security Enforcers. The holographic Shard was brought to the 20th century with Bishop.
 Wild Child – A former member of Alpha Flight who possesses heightened senses, fangs, and claws.

Afterward, writer Howard Mackie injected more political and espionage elements into the series, a trend that culminated in the team's secession from government sponsorship. Multiple Man and Strong Guy appear again at the same time. Despite Forge managing to fix Strong Guy's problems, he does not rejoin the team. The popularity of X-Factor continued to dwindle and Mystique and Sabretooth, two popular X-Men villains, failed to draw in more readers. Wild Child mutates out of control, Mystique hunts down Sabretooth (who had kidnapped young Tyler Trevor Chase), and Forge breaks ties with X-Factor.

In 1997, Marvel attempted yet another revival. After various stories focusing on individual characters, a new team was gathered consisting of Havok, Multiple Man, Polaris, Shard, and other members of the X.S.E., Fixx, and Greystone, that are brought to the 20th century. However, this version of the team disbands in the same issue in which they debut. In that issue, #149 (1998), Greystone builds a time machine meant to take him and his compatriots back to the future. However, the device explodes, killing Greystone and Havok. Afterward, X-Factor disbands.

The time machine's explosion transports Havok to a parallel world, populated by twisted versions of Marvel characters. He explores this strange world in the series Mutant X, which lasted from 1998 until 2001. Although Marvel planned to revive X-Factor as an ongoing title after Mutant X ended, this did not happen for another 4 years.

Volume 2 (2002 miniseries)
A four-issue X-Factor limited series was launched in 2002. This series focused on the government's new Mutant Civil Rights Task Force, which consisted of humans who investigated anti-mutant hate crimes and inadvertently discovered an anti-mutant conspiracy within their own ranks. This series focused heavily on the "mutants as a metaphor for minorities" aspects of the X-Men concept. The series was written by Jeff Jensen with artwork by Arthur Ranson.

Volume 3 (2005–2013)

X-Factor Investigations is a detective agency run by Jamie Madrox, also known as Multiple Man. The name is taken from the government-sponsored group the three founders previously served on. The initial staff consists of Madrox's best friend and special enforcer, Guido Carosella (Strong Guy), and former teammate Rahne Sinclair (Wolfsbane). Following the events of the "House of M" storyline, Madrox's new-found wealth from winning a Who Wants to Be a Millionaire?-style game show allows him to recruit several of his former colleagues from the Paris branch of the now defunct X-Corporation. New members include:

 M (Monet St. Croix) – a wealthy ambassador's daughter with an array of superhuman powers.
 Rictor (Julio Richter) – A Mexican mutant who can produce powerful seismic waves.
 Siryn (Theresa Cassidy) – Banshee's daughter with similar sonic-based powers.
 Layla Miller – a young mutant who inserts herself into the group to keep them from discovering the truth behind the "Decimation" storyline.

Peter David put a noir spin on the mutant series and dealt with Jamie Madrox as the central character. The new series spun off of the "House of M" and "Decimation" storylines and also "Madrox" mini-series opens with a suicide attempt by Rictor, who has lost his powers. The series deals with the group's attempt to unravel the truth behind the "Decimation" and its aftermath, fighting with Singularity Investigations, and dealing with Madrox's powers and their consequences.

During the "Messiah Complex" storyline, Jamie and Layla travel to a dystopian future in which mutants are persecuted and imprisoned. Jamie escapes and returns to the early 21st century, but Layla is still trapped. Rahne fears (because of a glimpse she has had of the future) that she, while in her wolf shape, will murder Jamie and Layla. To prevent this, she quits the team and joins X-Force. Rictor also quits. Jamie travels to the future with the help of an aged Layla Miller and helps a rebellion led by a cyborg Scott Summers and his daughter Ruby, while the rest of the team is in the present. After battling Arcade, who captured Rictor (who then rejoins), the team meets one of Jamie's duplicates, who calls himself Cortex and is joined by new members:

 Longshot – a genetically created humanoid from Mojoverse with favorable probability outcomes.
 Darwin (Armando Muñoz) – one of Moira's early recruit with reactive evolution powers.
 Shatterstar (Gaveedra Seven) – founding X-Force member with that can open dimensional portals and channel vibratory shockwave through his swords.

Writer Peter David's decision to explicitly establish male characters Shatterstar and Rictor entering a romantic relationship in X-Factor #45 (August 2009), confirming clues that had been established in X-Force years earlier, drew criticism from Shatterstar's co-creator, Rob Liefeld, though Editor-in-Chief Joe Quesada supported David's story. David would eventually be nominated for and win a 2011 GLAAD Media Award for Outstanding Comic Book for this second run on the title.

In December 2009, the series adopted a cumulative numbering with issue #200, with 149 issues of the first volume plus 50 issues of the third volume constituting the previous 199 issues. During the Regenesis relaunch, Polaris and Havok joined the team in X-Factor #230.

The series ended with issue #262 in September 2013.

All-New X-Factor (2014-2015)

The next incarnation of the series was All-New X-Factor, written by Peter David and illustrated by Carmine Di Giandomenico. This version was announced as a part of the All-New Marvel NOW! initiative at the New York Comic Con in October 2013, and debuted in January 2014. The opening storyline, which continues events from issue #260 of the previous series, and depicts the corporation "Serval Industries" forming a new corporate-sponsored version of the team, which includes Polaris, Quicksilver, Gambit, Danger, Cypher and Warlock.

Volume 4 (2020–2021)
X-Factor was relaunched in July 2020 as part of Dawn of X written by Leah Williams and drawn by David Baldeon. The new team investigates cases of missing mutants and presumed deaths for Krakoa, confirming if they can be resurrected:

 Northstar (Jean-Paul Beaubier) – team leader and former Alpha Flight member with superhuman speed.
 Polaris (Lorna Dane) – an X-Factor alumna who can control metal.
 Prestige (Rachel Summers) – a telekinetic and telepathic mutant from a dystopian future.
 Daken (Akihiro) – Wolverine's son with similar powers to his father.
 Eye-Boy (Trevor Hawkins) – a young mutant with multiple eyes all over his body.
 Prodigy (David Alleyne) – former Young Avengers and Xavier Institute student that can mimic other skills and knowledge.
 Aurora (Jeanne-Marie Beaubier) – twin sister of Northstar with the same power.

The team works closely with The Five, a circuit of mutants introduced in House of X/Powers of X working in conjunction to resurrect fallen mutants:

 Goldballs (Fabio Medina) – produces a limitless amount of unviable biological eggs.
 Proteus (Kevin MacTaggert) – transforms the unviable egg into a viable one.
 Elixir (Joshua Foley) – biologically kickstarts the process of life, initializing cell replication and husk growth.
 Tempus (Eva Bell) – temporally matures the husk to a desired age.
 Hope Summers – enhances and synthesizes the other resurrection mutants' powers to ensure the success of each resurrection.

X-Factor Members
In 1986, the team debuted in X-Factor #1.

Collected editions

Oversized hardcovers

Trade paperbacks

Epic Collections

Volume 1

Volume 2

Volume 3

All-New X-Factor

Volume 4

Other versions
In Ultimate War, X-Factor is a U.S. operated prison camp for mutants in Cuba, which appears to have been named after Camp X-Ray in Guantanamo Bay.
 X-Factor appears in X-Men '92 as a peace keeping force after the X-Men disappear.
 Mutant X's X-Factor is known as The Six.

In other media
The second incarnation of X-Factor appears in X-Men: The Animated Series, consisting of Forge, Polaris, Multiple Man, Strong Guy, Quicksilver,  Havok, and Wolfsbane.

References

External links
 
 X-Factor issues on Marvel.com
 X-Factor, X-Factor vol. 2, and X-Factor vol. 3 at the Comic Book DB
 X-Factor, X-Factor vol. 2, and X-Factor vol. 3 at the Grand Comics Database

 
Comics characters introduced in 1986
Comics by J. M. DeMatteis
Comics by Louise Simonson
Comics by Walt Simonson
Comics spin-offs
GLAAD Media Award for Outstanding Comic Book winners
X-Men supporting characters